Leonard Michael (3 June 1921 – 16 March 1996) was an Australian cricketer. He played in twenty-one first-class matches for South Australia between 1939 and 1952.

See also
 List of South Australian representative cricketers

References

External links
 

1921 births
1996 deaths
Australian cricketers
South Australia cricketers
Cricketers from Adelaide